The 1963 West Virginia Mountaineers football team represented West Virginia University as a member of the Southern Conference (SoCon) during the 1963 NCAA University Division football season. Led by fourth-year head coach Gene Corum, the Mountaineers compiled an overall record of 4–6 with a mark of 3–1 in conference play, placing second in the SoCon.

Schedule

References

West Virginia
West Virginia Mountaineers football seasons
West Virginia Mountaineers football